China National Highway 568 runs from Lanzhou to Luqu via Linxia and Xiahe. It is one of the new trunk highways proposed in the China National Highway Network Planning (2013 - 2030).

Route

See also 

 China National Highways

References 

Transport in Gansu